Dobongsan Station is a subway station on the Seoul Subway Line 1 and Line 7. It is the closest station to Mt. Dobong, where its name also comes from.

This station is geographically the northernmost station in Seoul. In addition, the Line 7 station is a transfer station operated by Seoul Metro that is not underground.

References

External links
 Station information from Korail

Seoul Metropolitan Subway stations
Metro stations in Dobong District
Railway stations opened in 1986